Greg Marsh is a British entrepreneur who founded hospitality company onefinestay and cost of living tool Nous.

Early life 
Marsh was born in London. He read English and philosophy at Christ's College, Cambridge. He later attended Harvard Business School on a Fulbright Scholarship, and was twice named Ford Scholar. Marsh is the grandson of Amnesty International founder Peter Benenson, who was the only child of campaigner Flora Solomon.

Career 
In 2009, Marsh came up with the idea for hospitality business onefinestay. It launched in 2010 and was acquired six years later by AccorHotels for at least $170 million (£117 million). After Marsh left the company in September 2016, he was appointed as a panel member of the 2017 Taylor Review of Modern Working Practices, commissioned by then British Prime Minister Theresa May. That year, he joined the faculty at Harvard Business School, teaching entrepreneurship, and was also elected to the International Board of Amnesty International. Marsh is also a visiting professor at Imperial College Business School.

In 2021, Marsh co-founded Nous, which aggregates cost of living data for consumers in areas such as energy, insurance and broadband. In February 2022, the platform announced it had raised £6.6m ($9m) in seed funding.

Marsh has contributed to British newspapers and broadcast media, on topics including entrepreneurialism, consumer budgeting, the cost of living crisis and mental health.

Personal life 
In 2011 Marsh polled 11th in a list of London's most eligible start-up CEOs.

References

Living people

Year of birth missing (living people)
21st-century British businesspeople
English businesspeople
Alumni of Christ's College, Cambridge
Harvard Business School alumni